Guere may refer to:

 Guere, Cameroon, a commune in Cameroon
 Guéré, an alternative name for the Wè language
 Güere River, northern Venezuela
 Guéré, a wadi in the Borkou region, Chad